Robert Gleckler (January 11, 1887 – February 25, 1939) was an American film and stage actor who appeared in nearly 60 movies between 1927 until his death in 1939. He was cast for the role of Jonas Wilkerson, overseer of the slaves at Tara in Gone with the Wind, but died during the filming and was replaced with Victor Jory.

Selected filmography

 The Dove (1927) as Minor Role (uncredited)
 Mother's Boy (1929) as Gus LeGrand
 The Sea God (1930) as Big Schultz
 Big Money (1930) as Monk
 The Finger Points (1931) as Larry Haynes - Sphnix Club Manager
 Defenders of the Law (1931) as Joe Velet
 Her Bodyguard (1933) as Hood (uncredited)
 Take a Chance (1933) as Mike Caruso
 The Personality Kid (1934) as Gavin
 Now I'll Tell (1934) as Al Mossiter
 The Defense Rests (1934) as Lou Gentry
 Million Dollar Ransom (1934) as 'Doc' Carson
 Marie Galante (1934) as Steamship Captain (uncredited)
 The Great Hotel Murder (1935) as Police Captain
 The Perfect Clue (1935) as Delaney
 It Happened in New York (1935) as Venitte
 The Case of the Curious Bride (1935) as Detective Byrd
 Go Into Your Dance (1935) as Pete Brown (uncredited)
 Mister Dynamite (1935) as James V. King
 The Headline Woman (1935) as Harry Chase
 The Glass Key (1935) as Shad O'Rory
 The Daring Young Man (1935) as Editor Hooley
 Dante's Inferno (1935) as Dean
 The Farmer Takes a Wife (1935) as Fisher
 Here Comes the Band (1935) as Simmons
 Whipsaw (1935) as Steve Arnold
 Show Them No Mercy! (1935) as Gus Hansen
 Too Tough to Kill (1935) as Bill Anderson
 Absolute Quiet (1936) as Jasper Cowdray
 Forgotten Faces (1936) as Mike Davidson
 Yours for the Asking (1936) as Slick Doran
 I'd Give My Life (1936) as Buck Gordon
 Love Begins at 20 (1936) as Gangster Mugsy O'Bannon
 Sworn Enemy (1936) as Hinkle
 The Girl on the Front Page (1936) as Bill
 North of Nome (1936) as Bruno
 Great Guy (1936) as Marty Cavanaugh
 King of Gamblers (1937) as Ed Merkil
 Wings Over Honolulu (1937) as Squadron Lieutenant Commander (uncredited)
 Pick a Star (1937) as Head Waiter
 The Man Who Cried Wolf (1937) as Capt. Walter Reid
 Hot Water (1937) as Hal Lynch
 Bulldog Drummond's Revenge (1937) as Hardcasle
 The Bad Man of Brimstone (1937) as Tom 'Skunk' Rogers (uncredited)
 Gun Law (1938) as Flash Arnold
 Rascals (1938) as Police Lieutenant
 Gangs of New York (1938) as Nolan
 Alexander's Ragtime Band (1938) as Eddie
 Little Miss Broadway (1938) as Detective
 Boys Town (1938) as Mr. Reynolds (uncredited)
 Fugitives for a Night (1938) as J. G. McGee (uncredited)
 Tarnished Angel (1938) as Checkers - Casino Owner (uncredited)
 Orphans of the Street (1938) as Hughes
 Ride a Crooked Mile (1938) as Prison Warden
 Stand Up and Fight (1939) as Sheriff Barney
 They Made Me a Criminal (1939) as Doc Ward (final film role)

References

Bibliography
 Solomon, Aubrey.  The Fox Film Corporation, 1915-1935: A History and Filmography''. McFarland, 2011.

External links

 
 

1887 births
1939 deaths
American male film actors
20th-century American male actors